Blair Mountain is the highest summit of the White River Plateau in the Rocky Mountains of North America.

Mountain
Blair Mountain in the White River Forest in Colorado was named for James Allison Blair who had been a Supervisor at White River Forest and died at the age of 52 in 1928. Held in high regard by his superiors for his service, the highest mountain in the area (formerly called 'Old Baldy') was renamed Blair Mountain in James Blair's honor.

Historical names
Bald
Bald Mountain
Baldy
Blair Mountain – 1928

See also

List of Colorado mountain ranges
List of Colorado mountain summits
List of Colorado fourteeners
List of Colorado 4000 meter prominent summits
List of the most prominent summits of Colorado
List of Colorado county high points

References

External links

Mountains of Colorado
Mountains of Garfield County, Colorado
White River National Forest
North American 3000 m summits